Huntington may refer to:

Places

Canada 
 Huntington, Nova Scotia

New Zealand 
 Huntington, New Zealand a suburb in Hamilton, New Zealand

United Kingdom 
 Huntington, Cheshire, England
 Huntington, East Lothian, Scotland
 Huntington, Herefordshire, England
 Huntington, North Yorkshire, England
 Huntington, Shropshire, England
 Huntington, Staffordshire, England

United States 
 Huntington, Arkansas
 Huntington, Connecticut
 Huntington, Marion County, Florida
 Huntington, Putnam County, Florida
 Huntington, Georgia (disambiguation), four places
 Huntington County, Indiana
 Huntington, Indiana, seat of Huntington County, Indiana
 Huntington, Iowa
 Huntington, Maryland (disambiguation), two places
 Huntington, Massachusetts, a New England town
 Huntington (CDP), Massachusetts, the main village in the town
 Huntington, Missouri
 Huntington, Nevada, ghost town
 Huntington, New York, the most populous settlement named Huntington
 Huntington (CDP), New York, a hamlet in Huntington, New York
 Huntington, Oregon
 Huntington, South Carolina (disambiguation), two places
 Huntington, Texas
 Huntington, Utah
 Huntington, Vermont, a New England town
 Huntington (CDP), Vermont, village in the town
 Huntington Center, Vermont, another village in the town
 Huntington, Virginia
 Huntington (Washington Metro), a Washington Metro station in Huntington, Virginia
 Huntington, West Virginia
 Huntington, Wisconsin

Other uses 
 Huntington (name)
Huntington family
 Huntington's disease, an inherited neurological disorder
 Huntington Bancshares, a bank headquartered in Columbus, Ohio
Huntington Library, an institution in San Marino, California, established by Henry E. Huntington
 Huntington Avenue Grounds, a baseball stadium that formerly stood in Boston, Massachusetts
 Huntington Hotel (disambiguation), multiple hotels
 Huntington University, a school in Huntington, Indiana
 Huntington Middle School, a public middle school in Warner Robins, Georgia

See also

Huntingdon (disambiguation)
Huntingtown (disambiguation)
Huntington Station (disambiguation)
Huntington Township (disambiguation)
Justice Huntington (disambiguation)